Essex Crossing is an under-construction mixed-use development in New York City's Lower East Side, at the intersection of Delancey Street and Essex Street just north of Seward Park. Part of the existing Seward Park Urban Renewal Area (SPURA), the development will sit on a total of nine city blocks, most of them occupied by parking lots that replaced tenements razed in 1967.

Essex Crossing, originally approved as a component of the Seward Park Urban Renewal Area in October 2012, is expected to create 1,000 housing units, 1,000 permanent jobs, and 5,000 construction jobs. The project, overseen by SHoP Architects and developer Delancey Street Associates (a joint venture of L+M Development Partners, BFC Partners, and Taconic Investment Partners), will build a 60/40 mix of residential and commercial space; create 500 units of permanently affordable housing for low-, moderate-, and middle-income households, and senior housing; and allocate  of publicly accessible open space. The plan was presented to the public in September 2013 by then-Mayor Michael Bloomberg, as a compromise solution after decades of political disagreements over the site.

Construction on the project began in 2015; partial completion is expected by mid-2021, and final completion by 2024.

Context

Seward Park Urban Renewal Area

Historically, the Lower East Side was an immigrant neighborhood, including Germans, Irish, Italians, and Hispanics; Essex Crossing was envisioned during the neighborhood's period of gentrification, but this part of the Lower East Side is an area alternatively known as SPURA, which has been up for development since the mid-1960s. SPURA covers five vacant plots of land acquired as part of a 1965 urban renewal plan, near Delancey and Grand Streets. These sites were originally part of the broader Seward Park Urban Renewal Area, a federal program designed to tear down several tenements to develop low-income housing, called the Cooperative Village. Some original SPURA land was eventually developed, but five lots remain vacant to this day. SPURA was the largest tract of undeveloped New York City-owned land in Manhattan south of 96th Street, but debate over what would be the "appropriate redevelopment" of SPURA had stalled the process and kept it undeveloped.

In 1967, New York City leveled 20 acres on the southern side of Delancey Street and removed more than 1,800 low-income, largely Puerto Rican families, with a promise that they would return to new low-income apartments when they were built. However, political corruption abounded, and the new apartments were never built. The competing forces within the neighborhood debated whether the SPURA area should be used to develop affordable housing within Manhattan Community Board 3; or be developed as mixed-use – low- and middle-income as well as commercial; or whether it should be all large commercial retail use. This debate is often waged in  the community halls of local public school auditoriums and other city meeting places, in newspaper columns, at co-op board meetings, and at private strategy sessions in individual homes.

During the Koch administration that ended in 1989, the city contracted with Sam LeFrak to build, but massive divided opposition caused it to be withdrawn. The land still sat vacant in 2012.

In January and February 2011, the local community board took the issue of SPURA's development up and came to a community consensus that the area will be built to accommodate mixed use of low-income housing, commercial properties/retail spaces, and market-value homes. The Board, community and city planners and public officials were to finalize the plans for development.

On October 11, 2012, the New York City Council approved the project, then still referred to as SPURA, in a unanimous vote. On September 18, 2013, the then Mayor Michael Bloomberg unveiled a definite plan for the Essex Crossing project.

Start of construction
In June 2014, demolition of structures in the area commenced making way for the development. On August 2, 2014, it was revealed that a municipal parking lot at Broome and Essex Streets would be closed for soil testing and planning of the future Warhol museum. Groundbreaking for the crossing was said to come as early as spring 2015, though a definite groundbreaking timeline had not been published. Another parking lot was closed on December 31, this time a private one on Suffolk Street. Final designs for Essex Crossing were to be released on January 14, 2015. The Essex Street Market and a firehouse on Broome Street were to be demolished by early 2015.

Description
Upon its completion, it will comprise the Essex Market, restaurants, office space, a movie theater, and a park.

Ultimately, Essex Crossing, split among ten sequentially numbered lots, will be built on the east side of Essex Street between Stanton and Delancey Streets (lots 8, 9, and 10); the municipal parking lot at Broome and Essex Streets (lot 7); an area bounded by Attorney, Broome, Essex, and Delancey Streets (lots 1, 2, 3, 4, and 6); and a block bounded by Grand, Clinton, Broome, and Suffolk Streets (lot 5).

Existing

Housing

There are both public housing and condominiums in the area. In the SPURA area, public housing is operated by the Seward Park Housing Corporation, part of the Cooperative Village, located in the triangle between Grand Street and East Broadway, and abuts Seward Park. The buildings, designed by Herman Jessor, were finished in 1959. Condominiums include the Blue Tower at 105 Norfolk Street, designed by Bernard Tschumi, opened in 2007 with 32 condominium apartments over 16 stories, a ground floor commercial space occupied by the Thierry Goldberg Gallery, and a roof terrace for residents on the third floor, using a common setup with commercial space at the ground floor with residential space above. The Blue Tower is not LEED certified. The tower had a characteristic slant that sets it apart from other buildings in the vicinity.

Essex Street Market

The Essex Street Market is an indoor retail market, one of a number of such facilities built in the 1930s under the administration of Mayor Fiorello La Guardia, at 120 Essex Street, north of Delancey Street. The Essex Street Market, a group of markets constructed in the 1940s to reduce pushcart congestion on the narrow streets of the Lower East Side, is operated and managed by the New York City Economic Development Corporation (NYCEDC). 

In September 2013, it was announced that the market would be integrated into the Essex Crossing. The new building, along Essex Street on the south side of Delancey, will have 39 stalls and two restaurants. It was originally planned to open in 2018, but was later pushed back to April 2019, then to May 13, 2019.

Essex Street municipal parking lot
An existing parking garage at 107 Essex Street, north of Delancey Street, is also being renovated as part of the redevelopment plan. Originally slated to be converted into housing under an idea by Councilwoman Margaret Chin, it was dropped from the project and later put back on.

New buildings

Broome Street Gardens
Part of the development includes a new public park on Broome Street between Suffolk and Clinton streets, spanning . The park, which is part of the Seward Park Urban Renewal Area, will only be 35% planted, with open spaces, signage, bike racks, and skateboard-proof park benches. It will include a playground for toddlers, in anticipation of a new primary school nearby.

Lowline park

The large trolley terminal under Delancey and Essex Streets sat unused for 60 years and became the location for a proposed park. 

The project was first proposed in 2011 and in 2012, successfully raised over $150,000 from 3,300 backers on Kickstarter to create a full-scale exhibition of the solar lighting technology. The project was named by Mashable as one of the top Kickstarter projects of that year. If completed, it would have been within the Essex Crossing development, though the project was indefinitely postponed in February 2020 due to a lack of funding and is considered in the planning stages as of 2021.

Housing

Half of the 1,000 units to be constructed at the crossing will be affordable housing. While five buildings will be completed as early as 2018, the entire housing complex will not be completed until 2021.

Housing on lots 1, 2, 5, and 6 will be completed first, in fall 2015, followed by Lot 8 in fall 2016 and lots 3 and 4 in spring 2017; lots 9 and 10 will be finished last, between 2019 and 2022. Most of the housing will be on lots 1, 2, 5, and 6, which will start construction in early 2015. They will have a combined 556 units, including 311 affordable units and 100 for senior residents. There will also be 155 condominiums, with 37 or 38 of them affordable.

Retail

Trader Joe's opened a  location on the first floor and basement of 145 Clinton Street, at the northwest corner with Grand Street, on October 19, 2018. The space on the building's second floor, immediately above Trader Joe's, is occupied by a  Target store, which opened in August 2018.

Movie theater
In October 2014, a  movie theater, with 14 screens, was announced. Located at Delancey and Essex Streets, and operated by Regal Cinemas, it includes digital cinema projectors and recliners with padded footrests, among other amenities, as well as an RPX Regal Premium Experience auditorium and bar. Scheduled to begin construction in spring 2015 for completion by 2018, the theater opened on April 6, 2019.

International Center of Photography 
In 2017, the International Center of Photography signed a deal with Delancey Street Associates to house its museum and school at 79 Essex Street in Essex Crossing. The new center opened in January 2020. Designed by architecture firm Gensler, the  building has galleries, media labs, classrooms, darkrooms, shooting studios, a shop, café, research library and public event spaces.

Canceled projects

Warhol museum
A  annex to the main Pittsburgh museum, the Warhol building was scheduled to open by 2017. It would have taken up a parking lot as well as the 75 Essex Street building, a building at the corner of Broome and Essex Streets that some locals are fighting to have landmarked. It was reported that Taconic offered 75 Essex Street's owners a huge sum to redevelop the building as part of the museum.  Plans for this museum were canceled in March 2013.

Political controversy
The SPURA area, now the Essex Crossing's site, was kept empty, except for parking lots, since 1967 due to suspected political alliances. 

Rapfogel and Silver were accused of promoting specific plans for favored developers, which would maintain the area's Jewish identity, at the expense of other communities. They opposed a 1970s plan for affordable housing, which would have changed the demographics of the neighborhood and brought in more Chinese and Hispanic residents. Silver instead proposed a shopping center with no housing for the site in the 1980s. In the 1990s, they proposed a “big box” store, like Costco, to be built by Bruce Ratner, a developer. Ratner hired Rapfogel's eldest son in 2007, and Silver employed Rapfogel's wife as his chief of staff. Ratner also helped raise $1 million for the Met Council.

Transportation
Local New York City Bus routes include the M9, M14A, and B39.

References

External links

SPURA:
 SPURA facts
 Curbed.com on SPURA
 Downtown Express – Seward Park Housing
 Downtown Express – Crowd of Hundreds

Andy Warhol
Economy of New York City
Food markets in the United States
Lower East Side
Neighborhoods in Manhattan
Proposed buildings and structures in New York City
Urban renewal
Multi-building developments in New York City